The Swedish Teachers' Union' is the largest teachers' trade union in Sweden. It has a membership of 209,000 and is affiliated with the Swedish Confederation of Professional Employees, and Education International.

External links
 Lärarförbundet official site.

Swedish Confederation of Professional Employees
Education International
Education trade unions
Trade unions in Sweden